Movies Askew is a short film festival run by Kevin Smith and View Askew Productions. "We've shown you ours. Now show us yours," submitters were encouraged. The 12 finalists of 2005 were screened at a gala event in Hollywood, California on September 6, 2006. The audience included a panel of celebrity judges with the likes of Jason Mewes, Scott Mosier and Donnie Darko director Richard Kelly.

Grand Prize Winner
Up Syndrome, directed by Duane Graves

Finalists
Chingaso the Clown, directed by Elias Matar
Soplipsist, directed by Luca Di Gioacchino
Perils In Nude Modeling, directed by Scott Rice
Raymond the Six Fingered Boy, directed by Isaiah Macmenami
Robin's Big Date, directed by James Duffy 
Whistlin' Dixie, directed by Morgan Schechter
Parallel Parallel, directed by Sean Becker
Someone to Love, directed by Shawn Goldberg
Earl's Your Uncle, directed by Thomas L. Phillips
R.U.U., directed by Shawn Goldberg
Rio Peligroso: A Day in the Life of a Legendary Coyote, directed by Duane Graves and Justin Meeks

References

External links
Movies Askew

View Askewniverse
Film festivals in Los Angeles
Short film festivals in the United States